Capinatator praetermissus is an extinct arrow worm from the Burgess Shale lagerstätte, living about 508 million years ago in what is now British Columbia. It has the distinction of having 50 spines around its mouth.  As with modern arrow worms, the spines were used to grasp prey for consumption.  C. praetermissus is thought to represent a stage of chaetognathan evolution before arrow worms became planktonic swimmers.

The worm was 10 cm long. The spines were curved and around 1 cm long.

The generic name "Capinatator" means "grasping swimmer".

References

Cambrian invertebrates
Fossils of British Columbia
Burgess Shale animals
Chaetognatha
Animals described in 2017
Fossil taxa described in 2017
Cambrian genus extinctions